Jason Goodall (born 23 January 1967) is an international sports broadcaster, specialising in tennis commentary and analysis. He is also a tennis coach who has worked with some of the best players in the world and is a former British number two professional tennis player.

Early years
Goodall started playing tennis in Zambia, Central Africa, when he was nine years old. Upon returning to the United Kingdom three years later he was chosen to represent Great Britain (under-12 level) and continued to do so throughout his junior career up to, and including, under-21 level. He was a silver medalist in doubles at the under-14 European Championships and went on to compete in all of the junior Grand Slam events on several occasions in both singles and doubles.

Tour career
At age 18 Goodall was given a wild card entry into the 1985 Wimbledon Championships where he met seventh seed Joakim Nyström in the first round. He was beaten by the Swede in four sets. His only other appearance in the singles draw at Wimbledon was in 1988, when he lost in straight sets to Italian qualifier Diego Nargiso. He participated in the Wimbledon men's doubles championships every year from 1986 to 1990.

He and partner Peter Wright were doubles runner-up at the Dublin Challenger tournament in 1987.

Goodall was ranked as high as British number two as a senior and was also national senior doubles champion. He was chosen to be part of the British team in two Davis Cup ties in 1989; away against Finland, which Britain won 4–1, and at home against Argentina, which the hosts lost 3–2.

Coaching
At the age of 21 he retired due to a chronic elbow injury and thereafter turned to coaching (occasionally still playing on the tour up until the 1990 Wimbledon Championships), working initially with 21-times Grand Slam doubles champion Pam Shriver. Whilst doing so, she made the final of the US Open doubles in 1989 with Mary Joe Fernandez, only to lose to Martina Navratilova and Hana Mandlíková 5–7, 6–4, 6–4. He then coached former world number four Fernandez and was coaching her when she made the singles and doubles finals at the Australian Open in 1990. Fernandez was beaten 6–3, 6–4 by Steffi Graf in the singles, and teaming up with American Patty Fendick in doubles, lost 7–6, 7–6 to top seeds Jana Novotná and Helena Suková in the final.

Goodall then worked with other players on the WTA Tour including former world number 25 Betsy Nagelsen and former world number ones Arantxa Sánchez Vicario and Jennifer Capriati as both coach and hitting partner before taking a position as International Squad Coach at the Lawn Tennis Association in London. As a fully qualified coach, he then worked with the best juniors in the country, both male and female, and oversaw their transition from the junior ranks to senior professionals.

Goodall was selected as Great Britain's Federation Cup coach in 1995.

He also coached former world number four Tim Henman in the off-seasons at various stages throughout Henman's career and traveled as his coach when his regular coach David Felgate was unavailable.

Media
In 2000 Goodall started to pursue off-court work and began television commentary, writing and producing at various tennis events around the world. He has published articles in various newspapers including The Times and the Wall Street Journal and currently commentates (often as part of a duo alongside Robbie Koenig) for various broadcasters including the BBC, Eurosport International, the Tennis Channel and Al Jazeera in addition to work for both the ATP and WTA Tours at various events throughout the tennis season.

Goodall is well known as both a lead commentator and as a play-by-play commentator in North America. He is well-respected within the game as a colour commentator and as an analyst, where his area of expertise is technical and tactical analysis. He often uses Hawk-eye as a tool with which to enlighten viewers as to what might prove crucial in determining the outcome of matches.

In 2014, Goodall, alongside Robbie Koenig, joined the International Premier Tennis League to provide commentary for the annual team tennis league which took place in various cities in Asia throughout December.

In 2015, Goodall joined ESPN to provide commentary and analysis during their tennis broadcasts, starting with the Australian Open. He continued to work with ESPN at the other Grand Slam events, including Wimbledon and the US Open.

In 2021, Goodall joined Tennis Channel as a play-by-play announcer, working alongside the likes of Jim Courier, Lindsey Davenport, Paul Annacone and Tracey Austin, amongst others. He also joined the Tennis Channel team for their coverage of Roland Garros. 

In 2022, Goodall continued to work at both ESPN and Tennis Channel at all of the majors and most of the ATP Masters and WTA 1000 events.

References

1967 births
Living people
English male tennis players
Tennis commentators
Sportspeople from Yorkshire
British male tennis players
British expatriates in Zambia